The Full Employment and Balanced Growth Act (known informally as the Humphrey–Hawkins Full Employment Act) is an act of legislation by the United States government.

Impetus and strategy
Unemployment and inflation levels began to rise in the early 1970s, reviving fears of an economic recession. In the past, the country's economic policy had been defined by the Employment Act of 1946, which encouraged the federal government to pursue "maximum employment, production, and purchasing power" by cooperation with private enterprise. Some Representatives, dissatisfied with the vague wording of this act, sought to create an amendment that would strengthen and clarify the country's economic policy.

The Act's sponsors embraced a form of Keynesian economics, advocating public intervention to increase economic demand and to secure full employment. Economists in the Carter administration, in particular the Council of Economic Advisers, pushed for an inflation target in the bill. The economists made references to the Phillips curve, arguing that there was a trade-off between unemployment and inflation.

Consistent with Keynesian theory, the Act provides for measures to create public jobs to reduce unemployment, as applied during the Great Depression.

The Act also encouraged the government to develop a sound monetary policy, to minimize inflation, and to push toward full employment by managing the amount and liquidity of currency in circulation.

Overall, the Act sought to formalize and expand Congress's role in the economic policy process, as governed by the Federal Reserve and the President.

Overview
In response to rising unemployment levels in the 1970s, Representative Augustus Hawkins and Senator Hubert Humphrey created the Full Employment and Balanced Growth Act. It was signed into law by President Jimmy Carter on October 27, 1978, and codified as 15 USC § 3101. The Act explicitly instructs the nation to strive toward four ultimate goals: full employment, growth in production, price stability, and balance of trade and budget. By explicitly setting requirements and goals for the federal government to attain, the Act is markedly stronger than its predecessor (an alternate view is that the 1946 Act concentrated on employment, and Humphrey–Hawkins, by specifying four competing and possibly inconsistent goals, de-emphasized full employment as the sole primary national economic goal).  In brief, the Act:

 Explicitly states that the federal government will rely primarily on private enterprise to achieve the four goals.
 Instructs the government to take reasonable means to balance the budget.
 Instructs the government to establish a balance of trade, i.e., to avoid trade surpluses or deficits.
 Mandates the Board of Governors of the Federal Reserve to establish a monetary policy that maintains long-run growth, minimizes inflation, and promotes price stability.
 Instructs the Board of Governors of the Federal Reserve to transmit a Monetary Policy Report to the Congress twice a year outlining its monetary policy.
 Requires the President to set numerical goals for the economy of the next fiscal year in the Economic Report of the President and to suggest policies that will achieve these goals.
 Requires the Chairman of the Federal Reserve to connect the monetary policy with the Presidential economic policy.

The Act set specific numerical goals for the President to attain. By 1983, unemployment rates should be not more than 3% for persons aged 20 or over and not more than 4% for persons aged 16 or over, and inflation rates should not be over 4%. By 1988, inflation rates should be 0%. The Act allows Congress to revise these goals over time. (It is worth noting that as of 2017 the Federal Reserve has had a target inflation rate of 2%, not 0%. 0% inflation is not considered ideal and can lead to deflation which can hurt the economy.)

If private enterprise appeared not to be meeting these goals, the Act in its original form, though not in its ultimate iteration, expressly allowed the federal government to create a "reservoir of public employment," provided of course that the legislation to establish the "reservoir" managed to become ratified. These jobs would have been required to be in the lower ranges of skill and pay to minimize competition with the private sector.

The Act directly prohibits discrimination on account of sex, religion, race, age, and national origin in any program created under the Act.

Amendments
The language of the Act was amended twice by riders, attached to unrelated or distantly related legislation.

 May 10, 1979: Public Law 96-10, attached to H.R. 2283, amended the Act to include federal outlays as a proportion of the gross national product when numerical goals are calculated.
 November 5, 1990: Public Law 101-508, attached to the Pollution Prevention Act, required the Economic Report to the President to be submitted within 20 days after the start of the session of Congress instead of 10 days after the submission of the annual budget.

See also
 Federal Reserve
 Economic policy
 Monetary policy
 Job guarantee

References

External links
 The Goals of U.S. Monetary Policy from the Federal Reserve Bank of San Francisco
 Bill summary of H.R. 50
 Full-text of reports from 1979-current from the Federal Reserve Bank of St. Louis: House Hearings, and Senate Hearings
 Public Law 95-523, 95th Congress, H.R. 50: Full Employment and Balanced Growth Act [Humphrey-Hawkins Act]
 Federal reserve inflation target 

1978 in American law
Economic history of the United States
United States federal commerce legislation
United States federal labor legislation
Hubert Humphrey
Full employment
Unemployment in the United States
1978 in economics